Oliver Lee, OBE is a former senior Royal Marines officer and subsequently chief executive.

Early life and education 
The eldest child of six children, Lee was brought up in Birmingham.  He was educated at King Edward’s School, Birmingham, and Jesus College, Cambridge.

Career 
Lee undertook Royal Marines officer training in 1996, winning the sword of honour and commando medal.  He subsequently served in Bosnia, Northern Ireland, Iraq and Afghanistan. He also worked in the private office staff of the Chief of the Defence Staff (Admiral of the Fleet the Lord Boyce) from 2000 to 2002 and defence ministers (Rt Hon Bob Ainsworth) from 2007 to 2009. He commanded 45 Commando on Operation HERRICK 14 in Afghanistan in 2011, during which he was promoted to full colonel, the youngest since World War II.

In 2013 he resigned from the Royal Marines on principle over the Sergeant Blackman (Marine A) Helmand Province Killing. He gave evidence at the Royal Courts of Justice in 2017 where Blackman’s original conviction of murder was reduced to manslaughter on grounds of diminished responsibility. 

On leaving the Royal Marines, Lee became chief executive of The Challenge, a large social enterprise delivering residential courses for teenagers to improve their understanding of others and their preparedness for adult life.

In 2022 Lee became chief executive of Places Leisure, a 6000-plus people, non-dividend company, dedicated to enabling health and fitness in more active communities.

Honours 
Lee was awarded the Queen’s Commendation for Valuable Service in Iraq in 2003. He was appointed Member of the Order of the British Empire (MBE) and then Officer of the Order of the British Empire (OBE) for service in Afghanistan in 2007 and 2012.

Personal life 
Lee's father, His Honour Judge Malcolm Lee QC, died of a heart attack in 1999 whilst serving as the Birmingham Mercantile Judge.  His brother, Adrian, died of suspected suicide in 2003.

Lee is married with two children.

References 

Year of birth missing (living people)
Living people